IST1 homolog is a protein that in humans is encoded by the KIAA0174 gene.

References

Further reading

External links 
 PDBe-KB provides an overview of all the structure information available in the PDB for Human IST1 homolog